Thomas Heebøll-Holm is a medieval historian at the SAXO Institute at the University of Copenhagen.  He is most known for his research involving medieval knights and the possibility that they suffered from Post-traumatic stress disorder and other hardships.  In his research, Heeboll-Holm has aimed to apply modern military psychology on the history of knights, using information gained in recent decades on the psychological effects of war on soldiers.  Heeboll-Holm has studied a number of ancient texts but has focused on three books by Geoffroi de Charny.

Heebøll-Holm is also known for his work on medieval piracy. In particular, he has argued that early Danish kings relied in part on piracy to build their political and financial strength. He is currently working as an Associate Professor with a PhD. in History at the Centre for Medieval Literature.

References

20th-century Danish historians
21st-century Danish historians
Living people
Year of birth missing (living people)